Irenita Duarte is a Brazilian actress. Her acting roles on Brazilian television include the soap operas Quem Casa com Maria (1964), Simplesmente Maria (1970-1971), and Um Sol Maior (1977).

References

External links

Brazilian television actresses
Brazilian telenovela actresses
20th-century Brazilian actresses
Living people
Year of birth missing (living people)